This is a list of the main career statistics of professional Argentine tennis player Gisela Dulko.

Performance timelines
Only main-draw results in WTA Tour, Grand Slam tournaments, Fed Cup and Olympic Games are included in win–loss records.

Singles

Doubles

Significant finals

Grand Slam finals

Doubles: 1 title

Mixed doubles: 1 runner–up

WTA Tour Championships finals

Doubles: 1 title

WTA Premier Mandatory & 5 finals

Doubles: 8 (3 titles, 5 runner–ups)

WTA career finals

Singles: 8 (4 titles, 4 runner–ups)

Doubles: 30 (17 titles, 13 runner–ups)

ITF finals

Singles: 8 (6 titles, 2 runner–ups)

Doubles: 12 (6 titles, 6 runner–ups)

Record against top 10 players

Dulko's match record against players who have been ranked in the top 10, with those who have been ranked No. 1 in boldface
 
  Flavia Pennetta 4–2
  Victoria Azarenka 3–3
  Jelena Dokic 2–0
  Martina Navratilova 2–0
  Sara Errani 2–1
  Alicia Molik 2–1
  Elena Dementieva 2–2
  Svetlana Kuznetsova 2–3
  Nadia Petrova 2–3
  Ekaterina Makarova 1–0
  Kimiko Date-Krumm 1–1
  Justine Henin 1–1
  Angelique Kerber 1–1
  Mary Pierce 1–1
  Carla Suárez Navarro 1–1
  Ana Ivanovic 1–2
  Conchita Martínez 1–2
  Anastasia Myskina 1–2
  Lucie Šafářová 1–2
  Samantha Stosur 1–2
  Paola Suárez 1–2
  Ai Sugiyama 1–2
  Nicole Vaidišová 1–2
  Dominika Cibulková 1–3
  Caroline Wozniacki 1–3
  Jelena Jankovic 1–4
  Maria Sharapova 1–4
  Daniela Hantuchová 1–5
  Vera Zvonareva 1–5
  Kim Clijsters 0–1
  Li Na 0–1
  Amélie Mauresmo 0–1
  Andrea Petkovic 0–1
  Dinara Safina 0–1
  Barbara Schett 0–1
  Lindsay Davenport 0–2
  Serena Williams 0–2
  Agnieszka Radwańska 0–3
  Marion Bartoli 0–5
  Maria Kirilenko 0–5
  Patty Schnyder 0–5

Top 10 wins

Notes

External links
 

Tennis career statistics
Lists of Argentine sportspeople